Luis Antonio Belluga y Moncada (30 November 1662 – 22 February 1743) was a prominent Spanish churchman and statesman during the 18th century.

Biography
Born in Motril, Granada province, he was ordained at the age of 14.  He served as a lector at the cathedral of Córdoba, canon at the cathedral of Zamora, and professor in the Colegio de Santiago in Granada. 

He supported Philip V of Spain and the Bourbons during the War of Spanish Succession, and was named by Philip bishop of Cartagena on 9 February 1705, as well as viceroy of Valencia and Murcia.  Pope Clement X named him cardinal on 29 November 1719.  He served as Camerlengo of the Sacred College of Cardinals (1728–1729), and as a crown-cardinal (circa 1732). 

He undertook major urban development and revitalization schemes in Murcia and in Vega Baja del Segura, where he initiated the colonization of uncultivated lands, founded new towns, established a seminary for theologians, drained swamps, and built hospices and hospitals.  The Plaza del Cardenal Belluga in Murcia is named after him.  The Cathedral of Murcia, the episcopal palace of the Diocese of Cartagena, and the Town Hall (with a controversial extension to the town hall by Rafael Moneo) are found on this square.         

In 1736, he provided support to the Capuchin missionary Francesco Orazio della Penna when the latter sought help for his mission in Tibet.

Notes

Resources 
 (es) Díaz Gómez, J.A. (2017), Luis Antonio Belluga: trayectoria de un cardenal oratoriano y su vinculación a la Chiesa Nuova, Annales Oratorii 15: 121-154. 

 (es) Díaz Gómez, J.A. (2016), Arte y mecenazgo en las fundaciones pías del cardenal Belluga bajo los reales auspicios de Felipe V. La irrenunciable herencia filipense, en M.M. Albero Muñoz y M. Pérez Sánchez (eds.), Las artes de un espacio y un tiempo: el setecientos borbónico: 57-75. Madrid: Fundación Universitaria Española.
 (es) Linage Conde, A. (1978), Una biografía inédita del cardenal Belluga, por el obispo de Ceuta Martín Barcia (1746), Murgetana 52: 113-134.
 (es) López-Guadalupe Muñoz, J.J. (2004), El mecenazgo artístico del Cardenal Belluga: la Capilla de la Virgen de los Dolores en la Iglesia Mayor de Motril, Imafronte 17: 81-112.
 (es) Vilar Ramírez, J.B. (2001), El cardenal Luis Belluga. Granada: Comares.

1662 births
1743 deaths
Bishops of Cartagena
18th-century Spanish cardinals